No. 111 Air Surveillance Squadron is a squadron of the Sri Lanka Air Force operating in the reconnaissance role using unmanned aerial vehicles.  It currently operates the IAI Searcher Mk II from SLAF Vavuniya. Until 2008 the unit was an independent flight No. 11 "UAV" Flight, but was expanded in 2007 to an operational squadron and split in 2008 to form No. 111 Air Surveillance Squadron and No. 112 Air Surveillance Squadron.

Aircraft operated
Year of introduction
RQ-2 Pioneer
IAI Scout
IAI Searcher Mk II - 2006
Lihiniya MK I - Locally developed UAV platform using for training purpose

References

External links
FORCE REPORT SRI LANKA AIR FORCE
scramble.nl

Military units and formations established in 2008
111